The South African Child Labour Programme of Action provides that pilot projects should be run on the Delivery of water to households far from sources of safe water. The Survey of Activities of Young People (SAYP) undertaken in 1999 indicated that collecting fuel or fetching water are by far the most common work-related activity done by children in South Africa. South African stakeholders have indicated, in the consultative process that led to the Child Labour Programme of Action, that the fetching of water over long distances should be regarded as a priority, given its prevalence and associated hazards.

According to the Child Labour Programme of Action, this work should not be seen as child labour, a term which implies that someone benefits unduly from the work that children do. Poor households have little control over the distance to water from the homestead, and often have no alternative but to ask their children to help in carrying water. Therefore, stakeholders in the country indicated that fetching water should rather be seen as a priority form of child work that should be addressed by the government's programme to deliver water to all households by 2008.

By delivering water to such households, the extremely long periods spent by some children in collecting water could be reduced, thereby making more time available for schooling and other activities. It should also reduce the hazards they are exposed to.

Accordingly, the Programme Towards the Elimination of the worst forms of Child Labour (TECL), a programme to kickstart action on the Child Labour Programme of Action, commissioned Dynacon Engineering and the Human Sciences Research Council to do research and design pilot projects with a focus on water delivery in distant areas. The purpose of the overall project is to investigate the phenomenon, to design and run pilot projects, and to develop and implement policy to assist in water delivery in such areas. 

This project was run in the following stages:

Stage 1: Research and design

The research and design stage of this pilot includes three processes:
Environmental scan of stakeholders, policies and literature, on the relevant pilot project focus: (a) report on stakeholder consultations and analysis; (b) literature survey, including analysis of relevant quantitative surveys and qualitative research; (c) recommended sites for possible implementation of the project, where a baseline study is then conducted; and (d) initial suggestions on how the project could be implemented. This report should be available soon at this [link].
Baseline study: within each of the selected candidate site, to inform the final choice of sites and to assist with the design of the pilot.
Project design for pilots in each selected sites.

Stage 2: Implementation of the pilot project

It is planned that the pilot project will run in two of the sites where the baseline study is being conducted, from about August 2005.

Stage 3: Development and implementation of policy

Policy will be developed during the pilot design and implementation stages. During the third stage a process through which the main implementing agencies, such as relevant government departments, will consider and possibly adopt key recommendations, operationalise measures, including budgeting for them. During this stage the pilot projects will be closed, or handed to government departments, agencies or NGOs.

Participating institutions

The following institutions are involved in the project:
Department of Labour, acting as the lead department of the Child Labour Programme of Action;
Department of Provincial and Local Government
Department of Water Affairs and Tourism.

External links

The latest version of the South African Child Labour Programme of Action can be obtained via this webpage.

Child Labour Programme of Action (South Africa)
Water supply and sanitation in South Africa